Dwight D. Eisenhower Highway (Wyoming) can refer to:

Interstate 25 from Colorado state line to Interstate 80
Interstate 80 from Utah state line to Interstate 25

Interstate 25
Interstate 80